Up Close and Personal with Marissa del Mar was a public affairs talk show produced by Millicent Productions, hosted by businesswoman and socio-civic leader Marissa Del Mar, and broadcast by IBC. The program premiered in 2002 and aired every Tuesday evening. Three years after, it was moved on Wednesday nights.

On June 1, 2011, the program was effectively cancelled by IBC in preparation for the introduction of AKTV programming block on IBC-13. Three months after, on September 10, 2011, Millicent Productions launched Buhay OFW that was also hosted by Del Mar and initially aired on AksyonTV and later in 5 Plus.

Background
Up Close and Personal peered onto the positive side of what life has to offer. It was an informative television program that features heart-warming success stories of people through segments on lifestyle, business, events, and places of interest. More specifically, it has a special public service feature that promotes civic-mindedness and concern to special needs and special attention to children and other people who have less in life.

See also
List of Philippine television shows
List of programs previously broadcast by Intercontinental Broadcasting Corporation

References

Philippine television talk shows
IBC News and Public Affairs shows
2002 Philippine television series debuts
2011 Philippine television series endings
Intercontinental Broadcasting Corporation original programming
Filipino-language television shows